This is a list of Wii games that are available on Wii U for download from the Nintendo eShop.

These games utilize the backward compatibility of Wii U with Wii games in order to run, albeit without needing to explicitly access the Wii Menu. Games that can be played with the Classic Controller can also be played using the Wii U GamePad as a controller instead. The download variants can also support any save files created on or transferred to the Wii U from any respective disc variant of the same title.

Although similar to Virtual Console games in some ways, they are usually treated as a distinct concept by Nintendo. However, they were referred to as Virtual Console titles on the Nintendo of America website. Unlike most Virtual Console games, they run on native hardware rather than emulation.

A total of 35 games have been released—of which 33 games were released in Japan, 30 in North America, and 28 in PAL regions.

Games
The following list is sorted by title by default. To sort by other columns, click the corresponding icon in the header row.

See also
List of Wii U games
List of Wii games
Lists of Virtual Console games

Notes

References

Wii
Wii